The Alpha Tau Omega Fraternity House, at 205 University Terrace in Reno, Nevada, is a Colonial Revival building that was built in 1929.  Also known as ATO House, the building is on a hill overlooking University Terrace Avenue in Reno's West University neighborhood, amongst other fraternities and sororities.  It was a work of ATO member and Reno architect Lehman "Monk" Ferris.  It was listed on the National Register of Historic Places in 2004.

Its NRHP nomination asserted it was significant "as the first fraternity-built house in Nevada", as an "outstanding" example of Colonial Revival architecture, and for its association with the social history of University of Nevada-associated fraternities and with prominent men throughout the state who once lived there.

References 

Houses completed in 1929
National Register of Historic Places in Reno, Nevada
Colonial Revival architecture in Nevada
Houses in Reno, Nevada
Residential buildings on the National Register of Historic Places in Nevada
Fraternity and sorority houses